The 1995 Hall of Fame Bowl featured the 25th-ranked Duke Blue Devils and the unranked Wisconsin Badgers.

Wisconsin scored first on a 19-yard interception returned from a touchdown by Jeff Messenger, as Wisconsin opened a 7–0 lead. Wisconsin's John Hall kicked two field goals of 48 and 43 yards as Wisconsin increased its lead to 13–0 at the end of the 1st quarter. In the second quarter, Duke's Robert Baldwin scored on a 7-yard touchdown run to make it 13–7. Duke added a 30-yard field goal before halftime to pull within 13–10.

In the third quarter, a 30-yard Duke field goal tied the game at 13. Running back Terrell Fletcher responded with a 1-yard touchdown run to give Wisconsin a 20–13 lead. In the fourth quarter, Darrell Bevell fired an 11-yard touchdown pass to Jason Burns increasing the Badgers' lead to 27–13. Robert Baldwin scored on a two-yard touchdown run making it 27–20. Terrell Fletcher put the game away with a 49-yard rushing touchdown, making the final margin 34–20.

Statistics

References

Hall of Fame Bowl
ReliaQuest Bowl
Duke Blue Devils football bowl games
Wisconsin Badgers football bowl games
Hall of Fame Bowl
20th century in Tampa, Florida
January 1995 sports events in the United States